David Robert Green  (born 2 June 1953), better known as Dave Boy Green, is a former British professional boxer who competed from 1974 to 1981. He challenged twice for the WBC welterweight title; first in 1977 against Carlos Palomino and again in 1980 against Sugar Ray Leonard. At regional level, he held the British and European super-lightweight titles in 1976, becoming the first British fighter to hold the latter, and the European welterweight title in 1979.

Early life
Green was born on 2 June 1953, in Chatteris, Cambridgeshire, a small fenland town. His father was a farmer and so Green's first experience of work was helping out around the family farm. He attended Cromwell School where he was keen on football and cross country running, but took up boxing in 1967 after joining the Chatteris Amateur Boxing Club. He was trained by Arthur Binder who had taught Eric Boon, a famous local boxer. Green had 105 amateur contests, winning 84 with 33 inside the distance.

Professional career
In 1974, Green turned professional under the guidance of manager Andy Smith. He made his professional debut on 10 December 1974, when he beat Yotham Kunda by knockout in the second round. Green went on to achieve 15 straight wins, earning a shot at the British light-welterweight title.

British light-welterweight champion
On 1 June 1976, Green entered the ring in a tiger-skin dressing-gown to win the British light-welterweight title against Joey Singleton with powerful hooks to the head and body. Though receiving stinging jabs all the while, Singleton was the better boxer, but Green's power began to show. The crowd wanted Green to deliver his "muck spreader" punch, but his boxing lead to a retirement in the sixth round.

European light-welterweight champion
On 7 December 1976 Green took on the Pride of Paris, Jean-Baptiste Piedvache, for the vacant European light-welterweight title. Green was staggered in the eighth round but Piedvache's left eye was beginning to close. With a strong right and left hooks, Green retired Piedvache in the ninth round while ahead on points. It was Green's 22nd straight win with 18 inside the distance.

On 29 March 1977, Green fought John H. Stracey at Wembley as a final eliminator to challenge for the WBC welterweight title. Stracey was a former WBC welterweight champion from the tough East End of London. The odds appeared to be even going into the bout, but Green went on to win the match due to Stracey's left eye starting to close.

Challenger for world title

Green vs. Palomino
On 14 June 1977, Green challenged Carlos Palomino for the WBC welterweight title at Empire Pool. Fortunes swayed with Green digging deep, his left eye closing, but Palomino boxed superbly to win by a left-hook knockout in the 11th round. It was the first time Green had been floored as a professional. After his loss, Green's next bout was against Andy Price, beating him on points.

European welterweight champion
On 23 January 1979, Green challenged Henry Rhiney for the European welterweight title. It was an all-British fight with all the tickets sold. The bout started at a terrific pace both men going toe-to-toe. A solid right to the head of Rhiney led Mr. Nathan to stop the fight, making Green a dual European Champion, and the first Englishman to do so since Ted Lewis in 1920.

On 28 June 1979, Green defended his European welterweight title against Dane Jørgen Hansen. Green knocked Hansen down in the second round, but the Dane fought on, knocking Green down twice in the third, and forcing the referee to stop the bout. Being a true sportsman Green applauded Hansen when the belt was presented.

Green vs. Leonard
The final challenge for the WBC welterweight title happened on 31 March 1980 against the holder Sugar Ray Leonard at the Capital Centre Landover, Maryland US. Green suffered a devastating knockout in the fourth round being out cold before he hit the canvas. Referee Arthur Mercante, ruled that it was too dangerous to continue the count and stopped at six. The Times reported "Leaning forward, dipping to left and right so that either hand could hit with equal venom, Leonard struck Green with a left and followed up quickly with a right-left-right, that started a clangour in Green's head, and the Briton crashed onto his back at the same place in the ring where Carlos Palomino had sent him toppling backwards".

Later career
After his loss to Leonard, Green returned to the ring on 14 November 1980, against American Mario Mendez, stopping him in the second round. Green's final bout, on 3 November 1981, was at the Royal Albert Hall against Reg Ford a New York-based Guyanese who was a one time sparring partner to Thomas Hearns. Andy Smith retired Green in the fifth round with cuts and a closing left eye.

After boxing
Green appeared in the BBC Series Superstars where he competed in the multi discipline event against other sports stars.

Currently Green is Chairman of Renoak Limited in Chatteris, a company he founded with Bob Emerson. Dave takes part in charity golf events. His success can be summed up by Sugar Ray Leonard, "Dave was a brave fighting man who never gave less than one hundred per cent whenever he put the gloves on. He is a warm human being who does tremendous work for charity, and I'm thrilled he has made such a success in business".

Green married Kay Curson on 26 October 1974. They have a son and twin daughters. In 2012, Green was awarded an MBE for services to Boxing and Charity in the Cambridgeshire area.

Professional boxing record

See also
List of British light-welterweight boxing champions
List of European Boxing Union welterweight champions
List of European Boxing Union light welterweight champions

References

Bibliography

External links
 

|-

|-

|-

1953 births
English male boxers
Living people
Welterweight boxers
Light-welterweight boxers
Members of the Order of the British Empire
People from Chatteris
European Boxing Union champions
British Boxing Board of Control champions
Sportspeople from Cambridgeshire